The Notteghem monoplane was a touring aircraft built in France in the early 1950s.

Design
The Notteghem monoplane featured a low-wing monoplane layout of mixed construction.

Specifications

References

1950s French aircraft